Ban Zelan may refer to:
 Ban Zelan-e Bala
 Ban Zelan-e Sofla